Jason Alexander Voros (born 31 December 1976) is an Australian first class cricketer. A left-arm fast-medium bowler, he played one day cricket with the Canberra Comets in 1998–99.

Voros was signed by Sussex in 2004, qualifying as a non-overseas player as his parents are Hungarian. He played just one first class game, against Loughborough University Centre of Cricketing Excellence. He took 4 for 40 in his first innings and added another victim in his second.

Vor0s currently works as an International Travel Consultant for Escape Travel on Qld's Sunshine Coast

References

1976 births
Living people
Australian cricketers
ACT Comets cricketers
Sussex cricketers
Australian people of Hungarian descent